Gürgen Öz (born 10 May 1978) is a Turkish actor.

Life and career 
Öz was born on 10 May 1978 in Zonguldak. After finishing his middle and high school education at the TED Zonguldak College, he moved to Istanbul to continue his studies. After studying art history at Istanbul University for a year, he enrolled in Mimar Sinan University State Conservatory to study theatre. As a student, he wrote a play titled Alman Satrancı.

After finishing his studies, he went on stage at various national and international theatre festivals. He subsequently worked for Bakırköy Municipality Theatre and State Theatres. At Bakırköy Municipality Theatre, he notably had a leading role in an adaptation of Yaşar Kemal's play Teneke.

He then started a career in TV and cinema. Between 2005 and 2007, he presented the late night show Televizyon Makinası, the first improvisational show broadcast on Turkish television. In 2008, he produced a short documentary titled Neden Böyle and his short stories were featured in various concept books. In 2013, he published his first booklet, titled Nevrotik.

Theatre 
 Teneke : Yaşar Kemal - Bakırköy Municipality Theatre
 Kadınlar da Savaşı Yitirdi  : Curzio Malaparte - Bakırköy Municipality Theatre
 Terk : Onur Bayraktar - Stüdyo Drama
 Suret : Onur Bayraktar - Stüdyo Drama

Filmography

Film 
 Zaman Makinesi 1973
 Plajda
 Çinliler Geliyor
 Hokkabaz
 Romantik Komedi
 Romantik Komedi 2
 Hareket Sekiz

TV series 
 Kısmetim Otel
 Aşka Sürgün
 Aşk Oyunu
 Avrupa Yakası
 Melek
 Sakarya Fırat
 Aşkım Aşkım
 Başrolde Aşk
 N'olur Ayrılalım
 Bay Yanlış
 Menajerimi Ara

TV film 
 Havva Durumu
 Kilit

References

External links 
 
 

Living people
1978 births
Turkish male film actors
Turkish male television actors
People from Zonguldak